Philip Roland Ouellette is an American former professional baseball catcher.

He later played in the Seattle Mariners, Houston Astros, and Detroit Tigers organizations.

Ouelette was working as a department manager at a Home Depot when he crossed picket lines during the 1994–95 Major League Baseball strike to play for the California Angels during spring training in 1995.

References

Sources

1961 births
Living people
American expatriate baseball players in Canada
Baseball players from Oregon
Calgary Cannons players
Clinton Giants players
Fresno Giants players
Great Falls Giants players
Major League Baseball catchers
Phoenix Firebirds players
Phoenix Giants players
San Francisco Giants players
Sportspeople from Salem, Oregon
Tucson Toros players
Toledo Mud Hens players